The 2015 Tro-Bro Léon was the 32nd edition of the Tro-Bro Léon cycle race and was held on 19 April 2015. The race was won by Alexandre Geniez.

Results

References

2015
2015 in road cycling
2015 in French sport